KRI Alugoro (405) is a submarine of the Indonesian Navy. The vessel was assembled by PT PAL and was launched in April 2019. She is the first submarine to be assembled in Indonesia.

Specifications
She has a peak speed of  when submerged and  surfaced. The vessel is powered by 4 MTU 12V 493 diesel generators.

Submarines of the Nagapasa class also possess ZOKA acoustic torpedo countermeasures manufactured by Turkish company ASELSAN.

Service history
The ship was ordered on 21 December 2011 as part of a US$1.07 billion contract between Indonesia and South Korea to provide three submarines, with Daewoo Shipbuilding & Marine Engineering being awarded the contract. As part of the deal, two of the submarines (Nagapasa and Ardadedali) were constructed in South Korea, while the third one was constructed in PT PAL's shipyard in Surabaya as part of a technology transfer program. Alugoro was the first submarine to be assembled and launched in Indonesia and Southeast Asia.

Prior to the original launching in October 2018, engineers discovered that the PT PAL Dockyard in Surabaya was too shallow for the submarine to be launched. Thus the Nagapasa was floated on a barge and relocated to Semarang Dock, within the same shipyard in Surabaya, about 350m away, but later returned the submarine to its original yard,  where it was launched on 11 April 2019.

As of April 2019, Alugoro was scheduled to be commissioned later that year. However, the ship was officially delivered only in March 2021.

The name Alugoro - originating from a weapon name in wayang tradition - was previously assigned to a Whiskey-class submarine built by the Soviet Union which was used during the 1962 Operation Trikora.

Alugoro was reported to have participated in the search for the ill-fated submarine KRI Nanggala

References

Attack submarines
Alugoro
Submarines of Indonesia
Jang Bogo-class submarines